Igrane is a town in Croatia, around 19 km south from Makarska. It has about 420 inhabitants.

At the highest point of the village is the "Kula Zale" tower - named after Ivan Anticic, and built during the 17th century as a protection against Turks. The Pre-Romanesque church of St. Michael (Sveti Mihovil), dating from the 11th century, dominates the village.

Tourism and agriculture are the main sources of income for the inhabitants.

References

Populated places in Split-Dalmatia County